Tilak Jayaratne (December 30, 1943 – September 7, 2012) was a Veteran broadcaster, media personnel, teacher and researcher and  writer to Radio and television.  He was instrumental in introducing alternative media forum for people Involved in the electronic media for the last 30 years. His Scripts of five avant-garde teleplay which ‘Andukola’, ‘Kadulla’, ‘Nadunana Puttu’, ‘Wanaspathi’, ‘Dande Lu Gini’ and ‘Kampitha Vil’ a result of ethnographic research conducted living with the community of people was outstanding themes to the teledrama industry Highly acclaimed.

Biography 
Tilak  worked in the technical section of the Sri Lanka Broadcasting Corporation and a part of the trade union movement in the mid 1970. He was a vibrant part of the community of young men and women watching plays and films and endlessly talking about them as well as about how one could use art forms such as theatre and the cinema, that could engage with a broader public, to build a process of critical inquiry into social and political issues. At the same time, Tilak was a creative writer, deeply committed to issues of social justice, and a thoughtful human being

Through his experiences at SLBC Tilak gained not only expertise in the technical aspects of broadcasting in the pre-digital age, but also experience in the specificity of the radio as a tool of mass communication.  He worked closely with colleagues involved in the creation of provincial radio stations, always focusing on the social and educational value of broad-basing broadcasting and enabling wider participation of diverse individuals and communities in developing programmes. The generation of the 1990s will recall him best as the ‘mover and shaker’ behind the New Education Service of SLBC, where he paved the way for radio listeners throughout the island to listen and learn about every new aspect of socio-economic and political thinking as well as about culture and literature from around the world. Some of the brightest minds in contemporary Sri Lanka developed their thinking and outreach on the basis of programming initiated and developed by Tilak through the Non-Formal Education Programmes (NFEP). Sadly, as the state-owned media became less interested in innovation and more focused on becoming the mouthpiece of the state, the space for challenging existing social and media norms shrank until the SLBC was no longer an institution in which Tilak could work. .

what remains the classic judicial precedent in this country on the value of an independent broadcast service (Wimal Fernando v. Sri Lanka Broadcasting Corporation [1996] 1 Sri LR 157, judgment of Justice MDH Fernando writing for the Court). The judges reminded the Chandrika Kumaratunge government of the day that its own media policy had emphasized the media’s right to expose corruption and misuse of power. The Court concluded that the basis on which the NFEP was stopped was clearly arbitrary. Even though the authorities contended that the matter broadcast was defamatory and politically biased resulting in public discontent, it was judicially opined that this was in fact, not the case. Instead, the NFEP dealt with matters of considerable public interest. For example, industrial unrest, its causes and its resolution, were of public concern and had been rightly focused on.

All his life, Tilak read voraciously, both fiction and non-fiction, covering a wide range of themes. Both while at SLBC and afterwards, he developed creative programmes for community-based broadcasting, encouraging young people to become more involved in and engaged with the process of communication. Starting off in the world of non-digital broadcasting, he made the transition to the era of television and the internet with great interest and enthusiasm. In the last ten or fifteen years, Tilak began to spend more time researching, traveling to live with marginalized communities to discover how traditional and indigenous modes of communication and narrative-building evolved and writing and talking about his work.

References 

1943 births
2012 deaths
Sinhalese academics
Sinhalese writers